Arachnura feredayi, the tailed forest spider, is native to Australia and New Zealand.

References

Araneidae
Spiders of Australia
Spiders of New Zealand